Kate Taylor is a British sex columnist who has written for British media including The Times, the Evening Standard, The Observer, The Guardian, The Sun, the Daily Mirror and the Daily Express.

In 1997 she joined GQ magazine and began writing the "Sex Life" column, a role she continued for the next five years.

She has published five books, including The Good Orgasm Guide, Life's Too Short for Tantric Sex, A Women's Guide to Sex, and co-authored The Wedding Survival Guide.

In February 2007, Kate Taylor released her controversial book for Penguin, Not Tonight, Mr Right, where she told readers to wait six months before having sex with a new man.

References

External links 
 Kate Taylor
 Article

20th-century births
British columnists
British sex columnists
British women columnists
British journalists
British women journalists
Date of birth missing (living people)
Living people
Place of birth missing (living people)
Year of birth missing (living people)